Henry Augustus Wyman was an American attorney who served as Acting Attorney General of Massachusetts following the resignation of Henry Converse Atwill and Acting Treasurer and Receiver-General of Massachusetts (along with Albert P. Langtry and John R. Macomber) following the resignation of Fred J. Burrell.

Early life
Wyman was born February 3, 1861, in Skowhegan, Maine to Henry A. and Fanny F. (Russell) Wyman.

Education
Wyman was educated in the schools of Skowhegan, Maine and later studied law in the office of Edward H. Bennett in Boston, Massachusetts and at the Boston University School of Law.

Family life
On February 13, 1891, in West Stoughton, Massachusetts, Wyman married Anne Cora Southworth

Career as a lawyer
Wyman was admitted to the bar at Boston in July 1885.
Wywam served as the second Assistant Attorney General of Massachusetts, and was a lecturer in criminal law at the Boston University School of Law. Wyman also served as an Assistant United States Attorney for the District of Massachusetts.

Massachusetts Attorney General
In 1919 Wyman was appointed to the office of Attorney General of Massachusetts to fill the vacancy caused by the resignation of Henry C. Atwill.  Wyman served as Attorney General during the Boston Police Strike.

Death
Wyman died on September 26, 1935, aboard the ocean liner Caledonia as it was nearing port in East Boston. He was 74 years old.

References

Massachusetts Attorneys General
State treasurers of Massachusetts
1935 deaths
Massachusetts lawyers
Boston University School of Law alumni
Boston University School of Law faculty
1861 births
Massachusetts Republicans